Robert Satanowski (January 20, 1918 – August 9, 1997) was a Polish general who later became a major European orchestra and opera conductor.

Life

Military career
A teacher with a background in engineering, during World War II he joined the Soviet-aligned Polish resistance in Volhynia where he became a leader of his own group of partisans. Later he joined the Ludowe Wojsko Polskie, where he reached the rank of a general. Later he joined the Polish Navy, but in 1949 he resigned from the military.

Music career
He started a career in music, becoming the director of Lublin Philharmony (1951-1954) and Bydgoszcz Philharmony (1954-1958). Later, he studied opera production and became the artistic director of opera in Karl-Marx-Stadt (now Chemnitz), Poznań (1963–65), Kraków (1975–77), Wrocław (1977–82), Warsaw (1981-91), and Aachen (1991–92). He also worked as a guest conductor across Europe, North America, as well as Iran and Turkey.

References

1918 births
1997 deaths
Polish conductors (music)
Male conductors (music)
Polish People's Army generals
Soviet partisans in Ukraine
20th-century conductors (music)
20th-century male musicians